Peter Anders may refer to:

 Peter Anders (tenor) (1908–1954), German tenor and favorite under the Hitler regime
 Peter Anders (songwriter), (Peter Andreoli) American songwriter and record producer, who collaborated with Vini Poncia among others